Beyond Tomorrow (also known as And So Goodbye and Beyond Christmas) is a 1940 American fantasy film directed by A. Edward Sutherland and produced by noted cinematographer Lee Garmes; Garmes was one of a handful of cinematographers who became film producers.<ref>[https://archive.org/stream/filmdail77wids#page/n169/mode/2up/search/%22Beyond+Tomorrow%22 "Hecht May Make Pix on Coast, Not in N. Y.; Lee Garmes mentioned as producer of Beyond Tomorrow'."] Film Daily, April 25, 1940, p. 2.</ref>

Structured as a B film, the production did not engage any stars who would receive billing above the title, relying instead on a quartet of veteran character actors, Charles Winninger, Maria Ouspenskaya, C. Aubrey Smith and Harry Carey, second-tier young leads Richard Carlson and Jean Parker as well as "other woman" Helen Vinson, a minor lead/second lead actress during the early- and mid-1930s, here approaching the end of her career. All seven actors received a "Featuring" billing after the title. The remaining supporting cast included Rod La Rocque, a top leading man of the silent era, now reduced to playing minor supporting roles.

Because the events of the plot take place during the Christmas season, it is a contemporary, but little-remembered example of the Christmas film. The original print has been digitally remastered and preserved by the National Film Museum, Incorporated.

Plot
Engineers George Melton and Allan Chadwick work furiously to complete a design on time, even though it is Christmas Eve. Michael O'Brien, the third partner in the firm, arrives with presents for all and kindly lets their employees leave. The three old men then go home to the mansion they share with Madame Tanya, an elderly countess dispossessed by the Russian Revolution, for a dinner with prestigious guests.

When the guests cancel at the last minute, George is convinced it is because of his dark past. To relieve George's black mood, Michael comes up with an idea to obtain new guests for dinner. Each man throws out a wallet containing $10 and his business card into the street. George's is found by Arlene Terry, who merely gives the money to her driver and discards the wallet. However, the other two are returned by more considerate people: Texas cowboy James Houston and teacher Jean Lawrence. They stay for dinner and soon become good friends with the three men and Madame Tanya. James and Jean also fall in love with each other, delighting the three men.

When the engineers have to travel to another city on business, Madame Tanya begs Michael to take the train rather than fly. He assures her it is perfectly safe, but Madame Tanya's premonition proves tragically correct when their aircraft crashes in a storm, killing all three. When James and Jean come to announce that they are engaged, they receive the bad news. The ghosts of the three men return home, where they are dimly sensed by Madame Tanya.

It turns out that Michael had bequeathed some bonds to the young couple so they could afford to marry. The story is picked up by the press, and as a result, James is invited to be a guest on a radio show. This is the opportunity he has been waiting for to showcase his wonderful singing voice. At the studio, James bumps into Arlene Terry, an established singing star. She wishes him well and is impressed by his performance. She had been wanting to replace her aging partner; she and her manager, Phil Hubert, offer James a starring role in her new show. He accepts.

As James spends time with Arlene rehearsing, he becomes infatuated with her and neglects Jean, much to the distress of the ghosts, who are powerless to do anything. When Arlene's ex-husband bangs on her door, she has James leave by the back door, but not before persuading him to take a three-day break from work with her in the country.

George is summoned to leave the world. Michael begs him to repent before it is too late, but George refuses to be a hypocrite and walks away amid thunder and lightning into the darkness. Soon it is Allan's turn. His son David comes to take him to Heaven to be reunited with his wife. When Michael is called, he refuses to leave James, although a voice tells him each person is summoned only once and that he will be doomed to roam the Earth forever if he turns it down.

When Arlene leaves her apartment to meet James, her ex-husband is waiting. He needs her help to get back on his feet. However, she coldly brushes him off. When Arlene and James drive away, the jealous, estranged husband follows and shoots them when they stop for dinner. James dies on the operating table with his spirit greeted by Michael who then intercedes on his behalf, pleading with a "voice from above", for a second chance for the young man. His wish is granted and James returns to life. Michael is reunited with a now-repentant George, and both are admitted into Heaven.

CastIn order of their appearance Harry Carey as George Melton
 C. Aubrey Smith as Allan Chadwick
 Charles Winninger as Michael O'Brien
 Alex Melesh as Josef (butler)
 Maria Ouspenskaya as Madam Tanya
 Helen Vinson as Arlene Terry
 Rod La Rocque as Phil Hubert
 Richard Carlson as James Houston
 Jean Parker as Jean Lawrence
 J. Anthony Hughes as Officer Johnson
 Robert Homans as Sergeant
 Virginia McMullen as Secretary
 James Bush as Jace Taylor
 William Bakewell as David Chadwick

Production
Principal photography for Beyond Tomorrow began in late November 1939 at the General Service Studios.

Song
The song "It's Raining Dreams" was written by Harold Spina and Charles Newman.

Reception
Although Beyond Tomorrow was considered a "Christmas Carol" and had some redeeming features including its talented cast of character actors, reviewer Bosley Crowther of The New York Times felt that the plot let the film down. "For its first half it is a latter-day Christmas carol, told with a gamin tenderness and warming as a hot toddy. But when its three elderly good Samaritans return from a plane crash as celluloid chimeras, its mystical peregrinations are more preposterous than moving." 

Home media colorized version
In 2004, a colorized version of the black-and-white film was produced by Legend Films and released by 20th Century Fox under the title Beyond Christmas."Beyond Christmas."  Yahoo! Movies. Retrieved: December 31, 2013."The Mark of Zorro Coming to Alhambra."The Kentucky New Era, November 29, 1940, p. 8.

In other media
Bridget Nelson and Mary Jo Pehl from the cult science fiction series Mystery Science Theater 3000 spoofed the film on RiffTrax December 15, 2017.RiffTrax: A Guide to Christmas and Holiday Episodes|Den of Geek

See also
 List of American films of 1940
 List of Christmas films
 List of ghost films

References

Citations

Bibliography

 Jewell, Richard B. The RKO Story''. New Rochelle, New York: Arlington House, 1982. .

External links

 
  (original black-and-white version)
 
 
 
 Beyond Tomorrow at Google Videos

1940 films
1940s Christmas films
1940s fantasy films
American black-and-white films
American Christmas films
American ghost films
American romantic fantasy films
Films directed by A. Edward Sutherland
RKO Pictures films
1940s American films